Borknagar is the debut studio album by Norwegian heavy metal band Borknagar. It is their only album to feature lyrics in the Norwegian language and their only album to feature Roger "Infernus" Tiegs on bass guitar (who reportedly recorded all his bass parts in a single day). The album was recorded at Grieghallen Studios (frequented by other black metal bands such as Burzum, Emperor and Gorgoroth).

The album features a more straightforward black/Viking metal approach (featuring heavy riffs, blasting tempos and an emphasis on harsh vocals) as opposed to the band's now trademark progressive/folk sound they would hint at on their next album, The Olden Domain.

Track listing

Personnel 

Borknagar
 Kristoffer Rygg (credited as "Garm") – vocals
 Øystein G. Brun – acoustic guitar, electric guitar
 Roger Tiegs (credited as "Infernus") – bass guitar
 Ivar Bjørnson – keyboards
 Erik Brødreskift (credited as "Grim") – drums, percussion

Other Credits
 Eirik "Pytten" Hundvin - production, mixing, mastering
 Christophe Szpajdel – logo

References

External links
Borknagar-Borknagar (1996 Debut Album)

Borknagar albums
1996 debut albums